Elections for Ipswich Borough Council were held on 7 May 1998. One third of the council was up for election and the Labour party kept overall control of the council.

After the election, the composition of the council was
Labour 40
Conservative 8

Election result

Ward Results
Sixteen councillors were elected.

Bixley

References

"Council poll results", The Guardian 9 May 1998 page 16

1998 English local elections
1998
20th century in Suffolk